The Plains is a census-designated place (CDP) in Athens County, Ohio, United States. The population was 3,080 at the 2010 census.

History
"The Plains" originally referred to the local region where the Mound Builders lived and built their signature Indian mounds. A post office called The Plains has been in operation since 1908.

Geography
The Plains is located at  (39.370281, -82.132299).

Open space
A nature preserve was created in The Plains recently by the Athens Conservancy. An extension of the Hockhocking Adena Bikeway is planned to traverse the preserve and provide bikeway access for the community.

Demographics

At the 2000 census there were 2,931 people, 1,224 households, and 714 families in the CDP. The population density was 1,275.8 people per square mile (492.0/km). There were 1,344 housing units at an average density of 585.0/sq mi (225.6/km).  The racial makeup of the CDP was 94.13% White, 2.42% African American, 0.31% Native American, 1.09% Asian, 0.27% from other races, and 1.77% from two or more races. Hispanic or Latino of any race were 0.82%.

Of the 1,224 households 29.0% had children under the age of 18 living with them, 41.0% were married couples living together, 14.0% had a female householder with no husband present, and 41.6% were non-families. 33.9% of households were one person and 11.6% were one person aged 65 or older. The average household size was 2.24 and the average family size was 2.88.

The age distribution was 23.5% under the age of 18, 10.4% from 18 to 24, 28.1% from 25 to 44, 19.4% from 45 to 64, and 18.5% 65 or older. The median age was 36 years. For every 100 females, there were 80.0 males. For every 100 females age 18 and over, there were 72.5 males.

The median household income was $30,102 and the median family income  was $44,761. Males had a median income of $26,687 versus $25,106 for females. The per capita income for the CDP was $17,164. About 13.3% of families and 17.7% of the population were below the poverty line, including 18.9% of those under age 18 and 14.8% of those age 65 or over.

Arts and culture
The Plains is known for its history of Native American burial mounds and ceremonial circles. Nearly 25 mounds were identified here, and the complex has been listed on the National Register of Historic Places.  These are collectively known as the Wolf Plains Mound Group. The Archaeological Conservancy has been buying the sites of the mounds to protect them from development.

Education

Public schools
The residents of The Plains are served by the Athens City School District and Athens High School.

Public libraries
The Plains has a public library, a branch of the Athens County Public Libraries.

Notable Residents 
Joe Burrow, who went to Athens High School, moved to The Plains when he was 9. He was drafted first overall by the Cincinnati Bengals in the 2020 NFL Draft.

References

External links
 Athens City School District
 Athens County Convention and Visitors Bureau

Census-designated places in Athens County, Ohio
Census-designated places in Ohio
1908 establishments in Ohio